William, Bill or Billy Reeves may refer to:

William Reeves (animator) (born 1959), Canadian animator and technical director
William Reeves (bishop) (1815–1892), Church of Ireland bishop and antiquarian

William Reeves (Australian cricketer) (1881–1962), Australian cricketer
William Reeves (New Zealand cricketer) (1857-1932), New Zealand cricketer
William Reeves (finance) (born 1963/64), co-founder of BlueCrest Capital Management
William Reeves (journalist) (1825–1891), father of William Pember Reeves
Bill Reeves (1875–1944), English cricketer
Bill Reeves (basketball) (1904–1983), American professional basketball player
Bill Reeves (footballer) (1888–1940), Australian rules footballer
Billy Reeves (born 1965), British songwriter and broadcaster
Billy Reeves (footballer) (born 1996), English soccer player
William Conrad Reeves (1838–1902), lawyer, academic and legal figure on the island of Barbados
William Pember Reeves (1857–1932), New Zealand statesman, historian and poet

See also 
William Reeve (disambiguation)